Comrade Chkalov Crosses the North Pole is a 1990 Soviet short comedy film directed by Maksim Pezhemsky. It was screened in the Un Certain Regard section at the 1991 Cannes Film Festival.

Cast
  Vladimir Baranov
 Viktor Bychkov
  Semyon Furman 
  Aleksandr Zavyalov 
  Abdullah Khalilulin

References

External links

1990 films
1990 comedy films
1990 short films
1990s Russian-language films
Soviet comedy films
Russian comedy short films
Films directed by Maksim Pezhemsky
Lenfilm films
Soviet short films